Volbrune is a village in the Cavaellon commune of the Aquin Arrondissement, in the Sud department of Haiti.

The village is located 2.5 kilometers southeast of Cavaellon on Route 2.

References

Populated places in Sud (department)